Oakley Hoopes Bailey  (June 14, 1843 – August 13, 1947) was a prolific panoramic map creator for several decades. He produced 374 maps from 1871 until he retired in 1927. Aerial photography replaced the months long process of capturing views  drawn in panoramic maps to a process that could be done in a day. The Library of Congress has a collection of his maps.

He was born in Mahoning County, Ohio and studied at Mount Union College in  Alliance, Ohio in 1862. In 1864, he served with the 143d Ohio Volunteer Militia, Company F, before returning to Mount Union and graduating in 1866. He began making maps in 1871, moved to Boston, and made many maps of areas in Massachusetts and Connecticut.

He died in Alliance, Ohio at age 104.

Maps

References

19th-century cartographers

1843 births
1947 deaths
People from Ohio
20th-century cartographers